Just or JUST may refer to: 


People
 Just (surname)
 Just (given name)

Arts and entertainment
 Just, a 1998 album by Dave Lindholm
 "Just" (song), a song by Radiohead
 "Just", a song from the album Lost and Found by Mudvayne
 Just! (series), a series of short-story collections for children by Andy Griffiths

JUST
 Jordan University of Science and Technology, Jordan
 Jessore University of Science and Technology, Bangladesh
 Jinwen University of Science and Technology, New Taipei, Taiwan

Businesses
 Just Group plc, a British company specialising in retirement products and services
 Just Group, an Australian owner and operator of seven retail brands
 JUST, Inc., an American food manufacturing company

See also
 
 List of people known as the Just
 Saint-Just (disambiguation)
 Justice, the idea or act of being just or fair